Bowling Green Township is one of twenty townships in Fayette County, Illinois, USA.  As of the 2010 census, its population was 457 and it contained 218 housing units.

Geography

Cemeteries
The township contains these five cemeteries: Antioch, Beck Private, Buchanan, Lorton and Oak Grove.

Demographics

School districts
 Cowden-Herrick Community Unit School District 3a

Political districts
 Illinois' 19th congressional district
 State House District 102
 State Senate District 51

References
 
 United States Census Bureau 2007 TIGER/Line Shapefiles
 United States National Atlas

External links
 City-Data.com
 Illinois State Archives

Townships in Fayette County, Illinois
1859 establishments in Illinois
Populated places established in 1859
Townships in Illinois